Rye St Antony School is an independent Catholic boarding and day school for girls aged 3 to 18 years and boys aged 3 to 11 years in Headington, Oxford, England. The school's name is commonly abbreviated and referred to by both pupils and staff as 'Rye'. Rye is unique as a girls' independent Catholic school founded by two women rather than by a religious order.

History
The school was founded by Elizabeth Rendall and Ivy King in 1930 after a visit to the Church of St Anthony in Rye, East Sussex.

There have been only six Headmistresses in Rye's history. In 1960, Miss Rendall died, and in 1963 the school became an educational trust with a Governing Body. Miss King continued as Headmistress until 1976 and, unfailing in her interest and encouragement, spent her retirement in a house in the school grounds until her death in 1993. Miss King's younger sister, Miss Gwen, joined the school in 1939 and faithfully served the school until her death in 2000 at the age of ninety-nine. Miss King’s successor as Headmistress was Patsy Sumpter who came to the school in 1959 and worked alongside Miss King in various posts before succeeding her as Headmistress from 1976 until 1990. Alison Jones was appointed as successor to Miss Sumpter, and the fifth Headmistress, Sarah Ryan, succeeded Miss Jones on Miss Jones's retirement in 2018 however, she stayed for just two years. Miss Joanne Croft is now acting head at the school.

The school grounds include a Victorian house built by Alfred Waterhouse, the Architect that designed The Natural History Museum, both in Oxford and London.

A new high specification Performing Arts centre was opened in February 2005. The school also opened a new Sports Centre (the Morton Sports Centre) in 2008 and renovated the Sixth Form Centre and Boarding house in 2010.

The school was rated "outstanding" in all aspects during their recent 2017 ISI inspection.

The school was criticised on social media for the wording of its 2020 exam results release in the midst of the controversial government algorithm used to determine grades, which was criticised by many for using the prior performance of a school to help determine results, causing pupils in low-income areas to achieve significantly less than similarly-performing students in more affluent areas. On 13 August 2020, the day the A-Level results came out, Joanne Croft, the headteacher, posted on Twitter; “#ResultsDay I’m so very proud of all our girls today for their #alevels2020 Ambitious and determined, no pandemic was going to stop them! #DreamBig #WorkHard #Success”. Her tweet caused substantial backlash on social media and was even covered by the Financial Times, which commented that the algorithm led to the school "overturning its normally below-average performance with a stunning set of grades this year."

Tangerine Party
One tradition at Rye St Antony is the 'Tangerine Party', held on the last day of the Michaelmas term, after the traditional Christmas Bazaar. This  originated after the girls knitted clothes for the WW2 soldiers and in return they sent gifts like fruit, especially tangerines to pupils whilst rationing was enforced during the Second World War. All members of staff, pupils and parents congregate informally in the Rendall Hall to sing Christmas songs, including 'All I Want For Christmas Is You', 'Merry Christmas Everyone', 'Rudolf the Red-Nosed Reindeer', 'Santa Claus is Coming to Town', and, finally, 'The Twelve Days of Christmas' (featuring Year 13 singing the coveted 'Five Gold Rings'). The school shares Christmas cake and everyone is given a tangerine. Songs are usually led by the Lay Chaplain and accompanied by the Director of Music; they become increasingly raucous as the Party progresses. Commonly, some male members of staff are required to stand up and sing 'We Three Kings' in front of the congregation.

Extracurricular Activities
The school offers the Duke of Edinburgh Award. Sport is also a popular aspect of the school with many pupils being members of sports teams and competing at county and national level.

Houses
There are four houses to which pupils are assigned and they generally remain in the same house throughout their time at Rye. These houses compete against one another in both academic and extra-curricular activities throughout the year, each led by a staff Housemaster. They are named after places with a significance Catholic history around Oxfordshire.

Stonor
Hendred
Holywell
Binsey

Boarding
The two boarding houses are each in the charge of two Housemistresses and their team of Under-Graduate Assistants. Girls have a choice of choosing full boarding, weekdays-only or flexi-boarding.

The Cottage for Years 11 and Sixth Form
The Croft for Year 3 to Year 10

Head Mistresses
 Miss Elizabeth Rendall (joint founder) 1930–60
 Miss Ivy King (joint founder) 1930–76
 Miss Patsy Sumpter 1976–90
 Miss Alison Jones 1990–2018
 Mrs Sarah Ryan 2018–2020
 Miss Joanne Croft 2020–

Former pupils
Those educated at the school include: Annie Tempest, cartoonist and sculptor
Teresa Freeman-Grenville, 13th Lady Kinloss
Emilia Clarke, actor
Jude Tsang, Singer-Songwriter/ Photographer, Hong Kong
Victoria Aguirre Vila-Coro (Bibi), PhD Visual Sciences, Madrid, Spain
Julie Furber (Julie Marriott), Executive Vice President at Belden Inc.

References

External links
 School website
 Profile on the ISC website
 Profile on MyDaughter
 Church of St Antony in Rye, Sussex

Girls' schools in Oxfordshire
Private schools in Oxfordshire
Schools in Oxford
Boarding schools in Oxfordshire
Educational institutions established in 1930
1930 establishments in England
Catholic boarding schools in England
Member schools of the Girls' Schools Association
Roman Catholic private schools in the Archdiocese of Birmingham
Girls boarding schools